Ziyarat Naqshband Sahab (also known as Mausoleum Hazrat Khawaja Naqshbandh Sahib) is a Sunni Muslim shrine, or ziyarat, in Jammu and Kashmir, in India. It is one of the traditional Mausoleums of the Hazrat Ishaans, who are descendants of Bahauddin Naqshband and Mughal royals. Besides the Ziyarat Naqshband Sahab in Srinagar, Kashmir, the Hazrat Ishaans have a Ziyarat in Lahore in Begampura.

History
This shrine is named after the well known Bukhara mystic, Khawaja Syed Baha-ud-Din Naqshband Bukhari, the founder of a Sufi order. It is one of the important shrines, located amidst a large garden.

The area in which this shrine is built was called Sikander-pore because it was built by Sultan Sikandar (1389-1413) (Sikandar Butshikan). During the Chak times Sulatn Hussain Chak (1563-1570) built a garden in this area. According to Tareekh-e-Hassan Zain-ul-Abidin (Budshah) had built a Shrine for Syed Mohammad Owaisi in Isham, Kashmir.  Owaisi died in 1484 and that shrine was more or less abandoned. In 1633 Khawja Khawand Mahmood obtained a fatwa to demolish the old shrine and used the same material to build the present Naqhband shrine, in what at that time would have been Hussian Chaks old garden. Because of Khawja Khawand Mahmood’s name the neighborhood is still called Khwaja Bazzar. After Khawja Khawand Mahmood’s death in 1640 in Lahore, his son Khawaja Moin-Ud-Din Naqshbandi came to Kashmir to look after the shrine. He died in 1674 and is buried at the shrine.  When the holy relic of prophet Mohammad’s hair was brought to Kashmir in 1699, it was first kept at this shrine. There was not enough space to accommodate the crowds that came to see the holy relic. So the Mughal Governor at that time donated what was then called Sadiq Khan Bagh. This place became the present Hazratbal Shrine that has since then housed the holy relic. In 1886 Nawab of Dhaka Sir Khwaja Ahsanullah, whose ancestors were from Kashmir, sent money that was used for major renovation of the present building of the shrine.

It is in Nowhatta on the road between the Dastagir Sahib and the Jama Masjid. Part of its compound was converted into Martyrs’ Graveyard in 1931. The market in the vicinity is named after the saints shrine as Khwaja Bazar

The mystic never visited Kashmir but his followers made a Khankah in his name. In this Khankah, the corpse of Mohi-u-din, one of his descendants lies buried in the mausoleum. This mainly wooden shrine has some fine panels done in the pinjra-kari style. The urs of Naqshband Sahib is observed on the 3rd day of the Hijri month of Rabi-ul-Awwal. Naqshbandi silsila followers 
are all over the world and also in  Kashmir Valley. Mostly in Safapora Manasbal, Kurhama Ganderbal, Bandipora, Srinagar, Pattan Baramulla and also in other districts 

Recently a library has also been constructed in the compound of the shrine.

Gallery

See also
Sayyid Muhammad ibn Hasan al Mahdi
Sayyid Abdul Qadir Gilani
Sayyid Bahauddin Naqshband
Hazrat Ishaan
Sayyid Moinuddin Hadi Naqshband
Sayyid Mir Jan
Sayyid Mahmud Agha
Sultan Masood Dakik

External links
 Ziyarat Naqshband Sahab, Moi-E-Muqqadas

References

Srinagar district